Wittenoom may refer to:

People
John Burdett Wittenoom (senior) (1788–1855), colonial chaplain of the Swan River Colony
Charles Wittenoom (senior) (1824–1866), fifth son of John Burdett (snr)
Sir Edward Horne Wittenoom (1854–1936), pastoralist and politician in Western Australia, son of Charles (snr)
Frank Wittenoom (1855–1939), pastoralist in Western Australia, son of Charles (snr)
Charles Wittenoom (1879–1969), pastoralist and politician in Western Australia, son of Sir Edward

Places
Wittenoom, Western Australia, a ghost town in northern Western Australia, abandoned after the effects of asbestosis were realised.